The Adriatico was an express train operated by Ferrovie dello Stato, linking Milan and Bari. It was named for the Adriatic Sea, Mare Adriatico in Italian, as the train's route served the main cities along the shore of the Adriatic between Rimini and Bari.

Trans Europ Express
 
In 1969, the Ferrovie dello Stato decided to replace their TEE diesel multiple unit trainsets with locomotive-hauled trains after the German and French examples. Because domestic TEE were allowed since 1965 (TEEs having previously been limited to international services), the order for the Gran Conforto coaches was enlarged, not only to replace the trainsets used on the existing international TEEs but also to convert the high-end domestic services to TEE. After delivery of the international coaches in 1972, two consists of eight and nine coaches each were available in the spring of 1973, and on 3 June 1973 the Adriatico became the first Italian domestic TEE. Initially, the service took 8 hr 35 min from Milan to Bari, thus reaching an average speed of 101 km/h.

The service slowed year after year and in 1982 it took 9hr 25min from Milan to Bari. In 1984, the rolling stock from the discontinued TEE Mediolanum was reallocated to the Adriatico, allowing the Adriatico to be operated with coaches in TEE colours thenceforth.

InterCity
On 31 May 1987, the Adriatico was converted to a two-class InterCity service. On 10 June 2001, the northern terminus was changed from Milan to Venice, and from 11 December 2005 the southern terminus was moved 149 km farther south, to Lecce.

References

Works cited

Named passenger trains of Italy
Trans Europ Express
Railway services introduced in 1973